Tsukasa Kobonoki (born 4 December 1991) is a Japanese biathlete.

Career results

World Championships

Rankings

References

External links
 

1991 births
Living people
Japanese male biathletes
Sportspeople from Aomori Prefecture
Biathletes at the 2022 Winter Olympics
Olympic biathletes of Japan
Asian Games medalists in biathlon
Biathletes at the 2017 Asian Winter Games
Medalists at the 2017 Asian Winter Games
Asian Games bronze medalists for Japan
21st-century Japanese people